The 1991–92 NBA season was the Nuggets' 16th season in the National Basketball Association, and 25th season as a franchise. To improve defensively, the Nuggets selected 7'2" Georgetown center Dikembe Mutombo with the fourth overall pick in the 1991 NBA draft, and also selected Mark Macon out of Temple University with the eighth pick. Mutombo was a native of Zaire, and spoke nine languages (English, French, Portuguese, Spanish, and five African dialects). The team also re-signed Walter Davis after a brief stint with the Portland Trail Blazers, and acquired Winston Garland from the Los Angeles Clippers. Mutombo had an immediate impact as the Nuggets showed improvement with an 8–8 start to the season, then holding a 17–26 record at the end of January. However, in the second half of the season, the Nuggets struggled losing nine consecutive games between February and March, then posting an 11-game losing streak near the end of the season. The Nuggets won just 7 of their last 39 games to post a record of 24–58, fifth in the Midwest Division.

Mutombo averaged 16.6 points, 12.3 rebounds and 3.0 blocks per game, and was named to the NBA All-Rookie First Team, while being selected for the 1992 NBA All-Star Game, and also finishing in second place in Rookie of the Year voting. In addition, Reggie Williams averaged 18.2 points, 5.0 rebounds and 1.8 steals per game, while Greg Anderson provided the team with 11.5 points and rebounds per game each, and Macon contributed 10.6 points and 2.0 steals per game, and was selected to the NBA All-Rookie Second Team. Garland provided with 10.8 points, 5.3 assists and 1.3 steals per game, while off the bench, second-year guard Chris Jackson contributed 10.3 points per game, second-year forward Marcus Liberty averaged 9.3 points and 4.1 rebounds per game, and Davis provided with 9.9 points per game.

Following the season, Davis retired, while Anderson and Garland were both released to free agency, and head coach Paul Westhead was fired.

Draft picks

Roster

Regular season

Season standings

y - clinched division title
x - clinched playoff spot

z - clinched division title
y - clinched division title
x - clinched playoff spot

Record vs. opponents

Game log

Player statistics

Regular season

Player Statistics Citation:

Awards, records, and honors
 Dikembe Mutombo, NBA All-Rookie Team 1st Team
 Mark Macon, NBA All-Rookie Team 2nd Team

Transactions

References

Denver Nuggets seasons
1991 in sports in Colorado
1992 in sports in Colorado
Denver Nug